is a Buddhist temple of the Sōtō school in Bessho Onsen, Ueda, Nagano Prefecture, Japan. It is the oldest Zen temple in Nagano Prefecture. The main hall (hon-dō) has a thatched roof and enshrines an image of Sakyamuni flanked by Manjusri and Samantabhadra as principal object of worship.
 Anraku-ji is best known for having the only extant octagonal pagoda in Japan.

History
The origin of the temple is uncertain. The temple claims variously to have been established in the Tenpyō era (729 - 749 AD) by Gyōki, or during the Tenchō era (824-834 AD) during the Heian period. During its early period, it belonged to the Ritsu sect. The temple is first mentioned in historical records during the Kamakura period, when it was converted to the Zen sect by a monk from Song China who came to Japan on the same ship as the famous Lanxi Daolong of Kencho-ji in Kamakura. By the mid-13th century, Anraku-ji was the center of learning in Shinano Province, educating many priests with the support of the Hōjō clan until that clan was overthrown in 1333.

Buildings and cultural assets

Pagoda
The temple's three storied pagoda is the only extant octagonal pagoda in Japan. Built at the end of the Kamakura period in Zen style, its lowest roof is a mokoshi pent roof enclosure. Its roofs are covered with hinoki cypress shingles. The inside contains an octagonal Buddhist altar which together with the pagoda and a munafuda ridge tag with information on the building's construction has been designated as National Treasure in 1952.

Statues of Enin and Isen
Two wooden seated statues of priests made in 1329 by a carpenter named Hyobu have been designated as Important Cultural Properties: One depicts Enin, a Chinese priest who came to Japan with Shōkoku Isen to become the second abbot of Anraku-ji; the other is of the Zen priest Isen, who went to study in China in the mid-Kamakura period and returned in 1246 together with Rankei Doryū, founder of Kenchō-ji. Unlike later sculptures, both show a high degree of realism. They are enshrined in the Denpō-dō (伝芳堂) hall.

Kyōzō
The temple includes a Buddhist library after 1784. Built to store sutras copied by the priest Tetsugen purchased from Mampuku-ji, the building is  square, plastered and has a copper roof. The building and rinzō have been designated as Cultural Assets of Ueda City.

Bell tower
Built in 1769 in a mix of Zen and Japanese style, the two-storey bell tower (shōrō) with a skirt like lower storey (hakamagoshi type) is one of the largest in the area. The original Edo period bell was used as scrap metal in World War II. The present bell was cast by Katori Masahiko in 1957.

Other
In 1693 important men of Shioda district decided to have Buddhas similar to those on the Shikoku 88-temple pilgrimage, so that they could acquire the same merit without going on a pilgrimage to Shikoku. They had statues made in Kyoto and distributed to various temples in Shioda. Out of 88 images, 7 are found at Anraku-ji. In addition, the temple owns a set of sixteen rakan (i.e. arhat) also from the Edo period.

A letter from Rankei Doryū to Shōkoku Isen written in classical Chinese showing the close relationship between the two is held by the temple:

See also

List of National Treasures of Japan (temples)

References

Buddhist temples in Nagano Prefecture
Ueda, Nagano
National Treasures of Japan
Soto temples